Samantha Davon James (born December 18, 1986), better known by her stage name 3D Na'Tee, is an American rapper, songwriter, and video director. She was born in New Orleans, Louisiana and grew up in the 3rd Ward. 3D Na'Tee has been featured on several national media outlets such as MTV, The Source Magazine, XXL Magazine, The Fader Magazine, RapRadar and RapRehab. She has also received attention from Louisiana newspapers and music magazines.

Career
In 1999, she began recording with local label called Clientell Records. Over the next five years, she recorded multiple mixtapes under the "Snypa Squad" and got featured on other projects by Clientell Records. However, in 2006, a year after Hurricane Katrina, Clientell Records dismantled and 3D Na'Tee, who had previously established herself as a battler rapper amongst the local rap scene in New Orleans, released her first mix tape project 3's Company Vol.1: The Rapper, The Hustler, the Diva followed by Volume 2 in 2007. After the release of her second project, she appeared on The Kush 2 DVD which was produced by YMCMB president Mack Maine. The DVD featured other Cash Money/Young Money artist like Lil Wayne, Nicki Minaj, and Birdman as well as Curren$y of Warner Bros. Records.

After the local success of her first two releases and her appearance on The Kush 2, she released her third mix tape Heavy Is the head That Wears The Crown followed by a music video for a song she titled, Guess Who's Coming 2 Dinner. That video piqued the interest of G-Unit Records affiliate and Shade 45 Sirius XM radio host Nelson Gomez who invited her to New York for an interview on his XM show as well as on rapper 50 Cents' ThisIs50.com website. Soon after, the talk of her third release also got her featured in HipHop Weekly Magazine by Benzino, former co-owner of The Source Magazine.

Because of video releases like Guess Who's Coming 2 Dinner which spoofed many mainstream hip hop artists, 3D Na'Tee's music has been described as controversial and sometimes offensive. That song also shared the title of her for mix tape released in 2010.

Guess Who's Coming 2 Dinner (The Mixtape) lead to 3D Na'Tee being nominated for a total of 5 Nola HipHop Awards by her in her home town at the NOLA Hiphop Awards. She won three awards (the most awards won by a single artist) for Lyricist of the Year, Mixtape of the Year, and Female Artist of the Year. The mixtape included collaborations from Curren$y (courtesy of Warner Bros. Records), Ebony Eyez, and Babs Bunny (formally of Sean "Diddy" Combs) founded group, Da Band.

In early 2011 3D Na'Tee was featured on MTV's SuckerFree Freestyle hosted by DJ Envy. 3D Na'Tee and Syleena collaborated on a song called Go Head.

July 27, 2011 3D Na'Tee released a video for Switch which she shot and edited herself. The song included several previously released instrumental versions of songs produced by super producer Timbaland. This video gained her a nomination for Director of the Year and an award for Video of the Year. Because of the momentum the Switch video gained the day of its release, Timbaland viewed it online and in less than 24 hours, flew 3D Na'Tee to Miami's Hit Factory Studio to work with her on her next project, The Coronation. After several months spent traveling with Timbaland and other artist signed to his label, a contract was presented to 3D Na'Tee to sign to Timbaland's production company Mosely Music Group and to be managed by members of Timbaland's management team. 3D Na'Tee and Timbaland later announced via Twitter that she was no longer a part of Timbaland's company because she decided not to sign the contract presented. In a later interview, 3D Na'Tee explained that there was no ill feelings towards Timbaland and cited her reasons for not signing were strictly because of contractual clauses that could not be agreed upon.

Exactly two years after 3D Na'Tee's last mix tape release, she released her highly anticipated street album The Coronation which featured artists like Keri Hilson, Young Fletcher, and Lyrica Anderson. The Coronation also featured production from Mizay Entertainment's Lex Luger, Maybach Music Group's Yung Shun, Heartbeatz, Casa Di, Versive Manhattan, Serious Beats, Da Smokestarz, among others.

In August 2012 it was announced by DJ Skee, Sirius Satellite Radio Host, that the first release from The Coronation entitled NO LOVE produced by MMG's Young Shun was the #9 most requested song in the country. The Coronation's second release, Lil Kim produced by Casa Di gained recognition as well as being featured on both The Source and The Fader Magazines websites. Lil Kim was a cautionary tale of a young girl with an absentee father who, because of her father's absence, unfortunately grew up and "fell in love" too fast. The song and its video (directed by Charley Mac), gained a lot of attention from tons of hiphop artist like Trina, Missy Elliott, and Chamillionaire, who featured 3D Na'Tee's video on his social site chamillionaire.com.

Personal life
She once was a student that attended New Orleans Center for Creative Arts for visual arts.

Discography

Albums
2012: The Coronation (Rerelease Plus Bonus Tracks)
2016: The Regime
2017: Songs That Didn't Make the Tape, Vol. 1

Mixtapes
2012: The Coronation
2010: Guess Who's Coming 2 Dinner
2008: Heavy Is The Head That Wears The Crown

References

1986 births
Living people
Musicians from New Orleans
American women rappers
African-American women rappers
African-American women singer-songwriters
American music video directors
21st-century American rappers
21st-century American women musicians
21st-century African-American women
21st-century African-American musicians
20th-century African-American people
20th-century African-American women
Singer-songwriters from Louisiana
21st-century women rappers